The 1950 Men's European Volleyball Championship, the second edition of the event, was organized by Europe's governing volleyball body, the Confédération Européenne de Volleyball. It was hosted in Sofia, Bulgaria from October 14 to October 22, 1950.

Teams
 USSR
 Czechoslovakia
 Hungary
 Bulgaria
 Romania
 Poland

Round Robin

Matches 

|}

Final ranking

References
 CEV
 Results

Mens European Volleyball Championship, 1950
International volleyball competitions hosted by Bulgaria
Men's European Volleyball Championship
Men's European Volleyball Championship , 1950
Sports competitions in Sofia
Men's European Volleyball Championship